Tschudi's slender opossum (Marmosops impavidus) is an opossum species from South America, named after Swiss naturalist Johann Jakob von Tschudi. It is found in Bolivia, Brazil, Colombia, Ecuador, Paraguay, Peru and Venezuela.

References

Tschudi's slender opposum
Marsupials of South America
Mammals of Bolivia
Mammals of Brazil
Mammals of Colombia
Mammals of Ecuador
Mammals of Paraguay
Mammals of Peru
Mammals of Venezuela
Tschudi's slender opposum